Montfort-sur-Argens (literally Montfort on Argens) is a commune in the Var department in the Provence-Alpes-Côte d'Azur region in southeastern France.

Geography

Climate

Montfort-sur-Argens has a hot-summer Mediterranean climate (Köppen climate classification Csa).

See also
Communes of the Var department

References

Communes of Var (department)